PEG-16 macadamia glycerides is the polyethylene glycol derivative of the mono- and diglycerides derived from macadamia nut oil by ethoxylation with an average of ethylene glycol units.  PEG-16 macadamia glycerides are commonly used in cosmetic formulations as an emollient, refatter, conditioner, solubilizer, and secondary emulsifier.

References

Cosmetics chemicals